The National Ombudsman (in Dutch: Nationale Ombudsman) is a Dutch political office. The National Ombudsman deals with citizens' complaints against improper conduct of government and is appointed by cabinet on the advice of the House of Representatives (Tweede Kamer). 

The National Ombudsman is a High Council of State.

References

External links
Official website

Government of the Netherlands
High Councils of State
Netherlands